The Wuhuan (< Eastern Han Chinese: *ʔɑ-ɣuɑn, < Old Chinese (c. 78 BCE): *ʔâ-wân < *Awar) were a Proto-Mongolic nomadic people who inhabited northern China, in what is now the provinces of Hebei, Liaoning, Shanxi, the municipality of Beijing and the autonomous region of Inner Mongolia.

History
After the Donghu "Eastern Barbarians" were defeated by the Xiongnu around 209 BC, they split into two groups. The northern Donghu became the Xianbei while the southern Donghu living around modern Liaoning became the Wuhuan. According to the Book of Later Han, “the language and culture of the Xianbei are the same as the Wuhuan”. Until 121 BC, the Wuhuan was a tributary of the Xiongnu empire. The Book of Later Han (Ch. 120) says: "From the time that Modu Shanyu crushed them the Wuhuan became weak. They were kept in constant subjugation to the Xiongnu and were forced to pay annual taxes of cow, horse and sheep skins. If anybody did not pay this tax his wife and children were taken from him."

In 121 BC, the Han dynasty general Huo Qubing defeated the eastern wing of the Xiongnu. He then settled the Wuhuan in five commanderies (Shanggu, Yuyang, Youbeiping, Liaoxi and Liaodong) created on the northern Chinese border in order to use them to keep watch of the Xiongnu. The chieftains of the Wuhuan paid annual visits to the Han capital Chang'an and were given rewards.

In 78 BC, the Wuhuan looted the tombs of the Xiongnu chanyus. The outraged Xiongnu rode east and defeated them. Fan Minyou was sent  with 20,000 men to aid the Wuhuan. However he arrived too late and the Xiongnu were out of his reach so he attacked the Wuhuan instead, defeated them and beheaded three of their kings.

In 71 BC, the Wuhuan joined the Han, Dingling, and Wusun to defeat the Xiongnu.

In 7 AD, the Han convinced the Wuhuan to stop sending tribute to the Xiongnu, who immediately attacked and defeated the Wuhuan.

In 49 AD, Hedan, the Wuhuan elder of the Liaoxi district, came to the Han court with 922 other chieftains and "paid tribute" to Emperor Guangwu of Han with slaves, cattle, horses, bows and tiger, leopard and sable skins.

In 58 AD, the Xianbei chieftain Pianhe attacked and killed Xinzhiben, a Wuhuan leader causing trouble in Yuyang Commandery.

In 109 AD, the Wuhuan joined the Xianbei in attacking Wuyuan Commandery and defeated local Han forces.

In 168 AD, the Wuhuan established some degree of independence under their own leaders. The largest of these groups were led by Nanlou in Shanggu, Qiuliju in Liaoxi, Supuyan in the Dependent State of Liaodong, and Wuyan in Youbeiping. 

In 187 Qiuliju joined the rebellion of Zhang Chun. Following the defeat of Zhang Chun in 188, Qiuliju attacked Gongsun Zan but was defeated. In 190 he surrendered to Liu Yu and died in 193. Qiuliju's son Louban was too young to succeed him so his cousin Tadun became acting guardian. In 195 Tadun, Nanlou and Supuyan supported Yuan Shao against Gongsun Zan. In 207 Tadun was defeated by Cao Cao at the Battle of White Wolf Mountain and died in battle. After their defeat many of the Wuhuan surrendered to Cao Cao and served as part of Cao Cao's cavalry forces. Louban and Supuyan fled to Gongsun Kang, who killed them.

Cao Cao divided the Wuhuan into three groups situated in Dai Commandery. The chieftains Nengchendi and Pufulu continued to cause trouble until 218 when Cao Zhang destroyed the last remnants of their power for good. Their remnants became known as the Kumo Xi, or the Tatabi, who were finally absorbed by the Khitans in the 10th century.

Culture

The Book of Later Han (Ch. 120) records:

Language

Andrew Shimunek (2017) classifies the Wuhuan (or "Awar"/"Avar", per Shimunek's reconstruction) language as the most divergent para-Mongolic language.

Battles
Battle of White Wolf Mountain
Battle of Nanpi

Rulers
Hedan (49 AD)
 Xinzhiben 歆志賁 (58 AD)
Qiuliju 丘力居 (187 AD)
Nanlou 難樓 (207 AD)
Supuyan 穌僕延 (207 AD) 
Louban 樓班 (207 AD)
Tadun 蹋頓 (died 207 AD)
Nengchendi 能臣抵 (207-218 AD)
Pufulu 普富盧 (207-218 AD)

See also
 Aohans
Beidi
Donghu people
Khitan people
Xianbei

References

Bibliography

 
States and territories established in the 3rd century BC
States and territories disestablished in the 3rd century
Ancient peoples of China
Donghu people